The 1985–86 Allsvenskan was the 52nd season of the top division of Swedish handball. 12 teams competed in the league. Redbergslids IK won the regular season and also won the playoffs to claim their tenth Swedish title. IFK Kristianstad and H 43 Lund were relegated.

League table

Playoffs

Semifinals
HK Drott–Redbergslids IK 18–20, 21–19, 13–14 (Redbergslids IK advance to the finals)
GUIF–HP Warta 23–29, 18–21 (HP Warta advance to the finals)

Finals
Redbergslids IK–HP Warta 24–27, 27–21, 24–16, 31–19 (Redbergslids IK champions)

References 

Swedish handball competitions